Zdunki  is a village in the administrative district of Gmina Ełk, within Ełk County, Warmian-Masurian Voivodeship, in northern Poland.

Local cuisine 

Beef and cabbage form the basis of many local dishes, particularly soft-boiled cabbage leaves wrapped around minced beef. Another speciality is breaded cutlets, and for sweet treats, piernik (gingerbread).

References

Zdunki